This is a list of airports in Delaware (a U.S. state), grouped by type and sorted by location. It contains all public-use and military airports in the state. Some private-use and former airports may be included where notable, such as airports that were previously public-use, those with commercial enplanements recorded by the FAA or airports assigned an IATA airport code.

From 2008 to 2013, Delaware was the only U.S state that had no airports in the FAA category known as commercial service (2,500+ boardings per year). In 2013, scheduled commercial airline passenger service became available at Wilmington Airport, but it ended in 2015. Commercial service to Wilmington Airport resumed in 2021, but ended again on June 6, 2022. Commercial service will resume in 2023.

Airports

See also 
 Delaware World War II Army Airfields

References 

Federal Aviation Administration (FAA):
 FAA Airport Data (Form 5010) from National Flight Data Center (NFDC), also available from AirportIQ 5010
 National Plan of Integrated Airport Systems (2017–2021), released September 2016
 Passenger Boarding (Enplanement) Data for CY 2019 and 2020, updated November 8, 2021

Delaware Department of Transportation (DelDOT):
 Airport Directory

Other sites used as a reference when compiling and updating this list:
 Aviation Safety Network – used to check IATA airport codes
 Great Circle Mapper: Airports in Delaware – used to check IATA and ICAO airport codes
 Abandoned & Little-Known Airfields: Delaware – used for information on former airports

 
Airports
Delaware
Airports